Thomas Francis Kenny (March 25, 1847 – ) was a tanner and political figure in New Brunswick, Canada. He represented Restigouche County in the Legislative Assembly of New Brunswick from 1879 to 1882 as a Liberal-Conservative member.

He was born in Bathurst, New Brunswick, the son of Michael Kenny and Ann Hughes, both Irish immigrants. In 1873, he married Helen Pritchard. Kenny served as a high school trustee for Dalhousie. In 1879, he moved to Andover where he also became involved in the sale of general merchandise.

References 
The Canadian parliamentary companion and annual register, 1879, CH Mackintosh 
The Canadian biographical dictionary and portrait gallery of eminent and self-made men ... (1881)

1847 births
Progressive Conservative Party of New Brunswick MLAs
People from Bathurst, New Brunswick
People from Perth-Andover
Year of death missing
Canadian people of Irish descent
19th-century Canadian politicians